Dayr al-Fardis is a town in northwestern Syria, administratively part of the Hama Governorate, southwest of Hama. Nearby localities include Kafr Buhum to the northeast, Tumin and al-Rastan to the southeast and Houla to the southwest. According to the Central Bureau of Statistics, it had a population of 5,890 in the 2004 census. Its inhabitants are predominantly Sunni Muslims.

During the Byzantine era, Deir al-Fardis's inhabitants was slow to convert to Christianity, eventually becoming Christian by the 540s. In 1829, during the late Ottoman era, the village was part of the sanjak ("district") of Hama, and consisted of 25 feddans. It paid 2,640 qirsh in taxes to the treasury.

References

Bibliography

 

Populated places in Hama District